Dänischenhagen is a municipality in the district of Rendsburg-Eckernförde, in Schleswig-Holstein, Germany. It is situated near the Baltic Sea coast, approx. 11 km north of Kiel.

Dänischenhagen is the seat of the Amt ("collective municipality") Dänischenhagen.

References

Rendsburg-Eckernförde